Forest Hill Park Football Club is a football club based in Catford, London, England.

History
The club was established in 1992 and was named after Forest Hill and Honor Oak Park. After linking up with Lewisham Steelers, they joined the Crystal Palace and District Sunday League for the 1992–93 season. After a successful season they switched to Saturday football, entering the Bromley and District Football League. They later moved up to the South London Federation League, before switching to the South London Alliance in 2001. Following a move to the Catford Wanderers Sports Ground the club was renamed Catford Wanderers and played under the new name for two seasons before returning to the original name.

The club won Division One of the South London Alliance in 2005–06, earning promotion to the Premier Division. They went on to finish as Premier Division runners-up in the next two seasons, after which the club moved up to Division Two West of the Kent County League. They won the division in 2009–10, earning promotion to Division One West. League restructuring saw the club playing in the merged Division One in 2011–12, before the split was reinstated in 2013 and they returned to Division One West. After finishing fifth in 2014–15, the club were promoted to the Kent Invicta League, a league they had unsuccessfully applied to join when it was formed in 2011. When the league merged into the Southern Counties East League in 2016, Forest Hill Park became members of the new Division One.

Ground
The club played at Burbage Road in Dulwich during the 1990s, before returning to Lewisham. During their spell in the South London Alliance the club played at the Catford Wanderers Sports Ground, before moving to the Ladywell Arena.

Honours
Kent County League
Division Two West champions 2009–10
South London Alliance
Division One champions 2005–06
West Kent Challenge Shield
Winners 2010–11

References

External links
Official website

Football clubs in England
Football clubs in London
Association football clubs established in 1992
1992 establishments in England
Bromley and District Football League
South London Football Alliance
Kent County League
Kent Invicta Football League
Southern Counties East Football League
Sport in the London Borough of Lewisham